Herbert Thomas Hargrave (30 March 1917 – 24 September 1996) was a Progressive Conservative party member of the House of Commons of Canada. He was born in Medicine Hat, Alberta and became a rancher by career. He held a Bachelor of Science degree from the University of Saskatchewan in agricultural engineering.

Early life
Hargrave was born in Medicine Hat in 1917, the sixth child of Thomas Albert Hargrave and Mary Hope Whimster. He received a degree in agricultural engineering from University of Saskatchewan in 1942.  During the World War II, he was a captain with the Corps of Royal Canadian Electrical and Mechanical Engineers.

Political career
He represented Alberta's Medicine Hat electoral district where he first won national office in the 1972 federal election. Hargrave was re-elected there in the 1974, 1979 and 1980 federal elections. He retired from federal politics after this after serving in the 29th, 30th, 31st and 32nd Canadian Parliaments.

Post politics
After his departure from the House of Commons, Hargrave was appointed to the Alberta Agriculture Hall of Fame in 1993. Following several years of declining health, he died at Central Park Lodge in Medicine Hat aged 79.

References

External links
 

1917 births
1996 deaths
Members of the House of Commons of Canada from Alberta
People from Medicine Hat
Progressive Conservative Party of Canada MPs
University of Saskatchewan alumni
Members of the Alberta Order of Excellence
Canadian Members of the Order of the British Empire